The Evansville White Sox were a minor league baseball team based in Evansville, Indiana that played in the Southern League from 1966 to 1968. They were affiliated with the Chicago White Sox and played their home games at Bosse Field.

Year-by-year record

References

Baseball teams established in 1966
Defunct baseball teams in Indiana
Defunct Southern League (1964–present) teams
Chicago White Sox minor league affiliates
Baseball teams disestablished in 1968